A rainbow is a meteorological phenomenon that appears as a multicolored arc that forms with the sunlight reflecting off water.

Rainbow may also refer to:

Art, entertainment, and media

Artwork
The Rainbow (painting), 1878 oil painting by American artist George Inness
Rainbow (sculpture), a 1970 sculpture at the Lynden Sculpture Garden

Fictional entities
Rainbow (Noon Universe), a planet
Rainbow, an organization in Tom Clancy's Rainbow Six novel series
Rainbow Road, in Mario Kart, a racetrack at the end of every game's Special Cup
Rainbow Johnson, a character in the American sitcom Black-ish and Mixed-ish

Film and television
The Rainbow (1929 film), an American film
Rainbow (1944 film), a Soviet war film
Rainbow (1978 film), American made-for-television biographical film about Judy Garland
The Rainbow (1989 film), a 1989 British drama, adapted from the Lawrence novel
Rainbow (1996 film), a British-Canadian family adventure
Rainbow (2005 film), a Chinese drama
Rainbow (2008 film), an Indian film
The Rainbow (2016 film), 2016 Sri Lankan Sinhala masala film directed by Nalin Rajapakshe
The Rainbow (BBC miniseries), 1988 BBC miniseries based on the D.H Lawrence novel
Rainbow (TV series), a 1972–1997 children's programme
Rainbow: Nisha Rokubō no Shichinin, a 2003 manga and anime series

Literature
"The Rainbow", also known as "My Heart Leaps Up", an 1807 poem by William Wordsworth
The Rainbow, a novel by D. H. Lawrence

Music

Albums
Rainbow (Boris and Michio Kurihara album), 2006
Rainbow (Mariah Carey album), 1999
Rainbow (Johnny Cash album), 1985
Rainbow (Miho Fukuhara album), 2009
Rainbow (Ayumi Hamasaki album), 2002
Rainbow (Dolly Parton album), 1987
Rainbow, a 1973 album by McGuinness Flint
Rainbow (Neil Diamond album), 1973
Rainbow (Kesha album), 2017
Rainbow (John Handy album), 1981
Rainbow (Sayaka Yamamoto album), 2016

Groups and labels
Rainbow (rock band), a British rock group led by Ritchie Blackmore
Rainbow (group), a South Korean girl group
Rainbow Records, a record label
L'Arc-en-Ciel (The Rainbow), a Japanese rock band

Songs
"Rainbow" (Curtis Mayfield song), 1962
"Rainbow" (Kacey Musgraves song), 2019 
"Rainbow" (Russ Hamilton song), 1957 
"Rainbow" (Sia song), 2017
"Rainbows" (Alice Nine song), 2008
"Rainbows" (Dennis Wilson song), 1977
"Rainbow", a song by Blackfoot from After the Reign
"Rainbow", a song by Colbie Caillat from her 2009 album Breakthrough
"Rainbow", a song by Émilie Simon from The Big Machine
"Rainbow", a song by Lynsey de Paul from the 1974 album Taste Me... Don't Waste Me
"Rainbow" (The Marmalade song), a song by the band Marmalade
"Rainbow", a song by Meghan Trainor from the 2022 album Takin' It Back
"Rainbow", a song by Robert Plant from the 2014 album Lullaby and... The Ceaseless Roar
"Rainbow", a song by Filipino band South Border from the 2004 album Episode III
"Rainbows", a song by Madvillain from the 2004 album Madvillainy
"The Rainbow", a song by Talk Talk from the 1988 album Spirit of Eden
"The Rainbow Song", a children's song sung on the television series Barney & Friends
"Rainbow Song", a song by America on the 1973 album Hat Trick
"Rainbow, Rainbow", a song by Peppa Pig on the 2019 album My First Album

Video games
Captain Rainbow, a 2008 Japanese action-adventure video game

Brands and enterprises
Rainbow, a water filter vacuum cleaner by Rexair
Rainbow Babies & Children's Hospital, a hospital in Ohio, United States
Rainbow Bar and Grill, a bar and restaurant in West Hollywood, California, United States
Rainbow Centre, Karachi, a building in Karachi, Pakistan
Rainbow Foods, a Minnesota grocery store
Rainbow Media Holdings, now AMC Networks, formerly a subsidiary of Cablevision 
Rainbow Room, an upscale restaurant and nightclub in Rockefeller Center, Midtown Manhattan, New York City
Rainbow S.r.l., Italian animation studio
Rainbow Sandals, a footwear brand
Rainbow Shops, a fashion retail chain
Rainbow Stores, a supermarket chain owned by Anglia Regional Co-operative Society
Rainbow Ski Area, a ski resort in the Tasman Region of New Zealand's South Island
Rainbow Studios, a video game developer
Rainbow Theatre, a building in the Finsbury Park area of North London, UK

Computing
Rainbow (software) collaborative software from Alcatel-Lucent Enterprise
Rainbow 100, a microcomputer
Rainbow storage
Rainbow table, a data structure used in password cracking
Rainbow, an application using the Okapi Framework

Flags
Rainbow flag (LGBT movement), symbol of diversity in the lesbian, gay, bisexual and transgender communities
Rainbow flags, flags used in various cultures and movements

Military
, a missile program
List of Rainbow Codes, a series of code names used for British military projects
Operation Rainbow, a 2004 Israel military operation in Gaza Strip
Rainbow, an L-class blimp given the US Navy designation L-7 in World War II
Project RAINBOW, a CIA project
Rainbow Sideboys, an honor guard used on aircraft carriers
Rainbow Herbicides, a form of herbicidal warfare
Rainbow Plans, a series of U.S. war plans
Republic XF-12 Rainbow, a 1940s military reconnaissance aircraft
Rainbow Division, another name for the 42nd Infantry Division of the United States Army National Guard

Organizations
Green-Rainbow Party, a Massachusetts, US political party
International Order of the Rainbow for Girls, a Masonic youth service organization
Mizrahi Democratic Rainbow Coalition in Israel
National Rainbow Coalition, a former Kenyan political alliance
RAINBO, an international non-governmental organization
Rainbows (Girl Guides), a youth organization in the UK
Rainbow (Greece), a Greek regionalist political party
Rainbow (Iceland), an Icelander eurosceptic and socialist party
Rainbow Family, a loosely affiliated group of individuals committed to principles of non-violence and egalitarianism
Rainbow Motorcycle Club, a gay men's motorcycle club based in San Francisco, California
Rainbow/PUSH Coalition, a US political organization
Rainbow Saver Anglia Credit Union, a financial co-operative, based in Lowestoft, United Kingdom

People
Rainbow (musician), member of the Birthday Massacre
Rainbow Rowell (born 1973), American author of YA and adult contemporary novels
Jeramy "Rainbow" Gritter, member of Whitestarr
Bernarr Rainbow (1914–1998), organist and choir master
William Joseph Rainbow (1856–1919), Australian entomologist
Edward Rainbowe (1608–1684), Bishop of Carlisle
Rainbow Sun Francks (born 1979), Canadian actor and songwriter

Places

Inhabited places

United States
Rainbow, Alabama
Rainbow, California
Rainbow, Placer County, California
Rainbow, Ohio
Rainbow, Oregon
Rainbow, Texas
Rainbow, Virginia

Other inhabited places
Rainbow, Victoria, Australia
Rainbow, Alberta, Canada

Natural formations
Rainbow Range (Chilcotin Plateau), British Columbia, Canada
Rainbow Range (Rocky Mountains), British Columbia and Alberta, Canada
Rainbow Springs, Florida, United States

Ships
Rainbow (1837 ship), iron paddle-wheel steamer, Birkenhead, England
Rainbow (clipper), the first extreme clipper ship to sail in the China trade (1845)
Rainbow (sternwheeler), steamboat which operated in Oregon, United States
Rainbow (yacht), J-class yacht involved in the America's Cup
, one of two Canadian warships
, one of nine British warships
, a Greek ship
, a ship of the United States Navy

Other uses
Human rainbow, a rainbow pattern formed by people
Rainbow (Netherlands), 1989 alliance of Dutch political parties
Rainbow (ride), an amusement park ride
Rainbow BRTS, a bus rapid transit system in Pune and Pimpri Chinchwad, Maharashtra, India
Rainbow Gatherings, a series of temporary intentional communities
Rainbow kick or rainbow flick, a football trick
Rainbow nation, a term describing post-apartheid South Africa
Rainbow roll, a sushi roll
The Rainbow (magazine), a 1981–1993 computer magazine
Ho-Oh, a Pokémon in the Rainbow category
ROYGBIV, acronym of the seven colors in rainbow

See also
Over the Rainbow (disambiguation)
Rainbow Coalition (disambiguation)
Rainbow Range (disambiguation)
Rainbow Road (disambiguation)
Rainbow skink (disambiguation)
Rainbow Warrior (disambiguation)
Rainbowman (disambiguation)
Rainbows in culture
Rainbows in mythology
Runbow, a 2015 video game